The following is a list of musical films by year. A musical film is a film genre in which songs sung by the characters are interwoven into the narrative, sometimes accompanied by dancing.

1920s

1927
 The Jazz Singer

1928
 My Man
 The Singing Fool

1929

1930s

1930

1931

1932

1933

1934

1935

1936

1937

1938

1939

1940s

1940

1941

1942

1943

1944

1945

1946

1947

1948

1949

1950s

1950

1951

1952

1953

1954

1955

1956

1957

1958

1959

1960s

1960

1961

1962

1963

1964

1965

1966

1967

1968

1969

1970s

1970

1971

1972

1973

1974

1975

1976

1977

1978

1979

1980s

1980

1981

1982

1983

1984

1985

1986

1987

1988

1989

1990s

1990

1991

1992

1993

1994

1995

1996

1997

1998

1999

2000s

2000

2001

2002

2003

2004

 Terkel in Trouble (animated horror)

2005

2006

2007

2008

2009

2010s

2010

2011

2012

2013

2014

2015

2016

2017

2018

2019

2020s

2020

2021

2022

Forthcoming

2023
 Spellbound
 The Little Mermaid
 The Color Purple

2024 
 Joker: Folie à Deux (October 4)
 Wicked (December 25)

See also
List of notable musical theatre productions
List of operettas
List of Bollywood films
List of highest-grossing Bollywood films
List of rock musicals
List of musicals filmed live on stage

References

Musical films by year
Films